The 86th Assembly District of Wisconsin is one of 99 districts in the Wisconsin State Assembly.  Located in north-central Wisconsin, the district comprises most of central Marathon County, including the city of Mosinee and the villages of Marathon City and Weston, as well as part of northern Wood County, including part of the city of Marshfield.  The district is represented by Republican John Spiros, since January 2013.

The 86th Assembly District is located within Wisconsin's 29th Senate district, along with the 85th and 87th Assembly districts.

List of past representatives

References 

Wisconsin State Assembly districts
Marathon County, Wisconsin
Wood County, Wisconsin